Landingsdalen (Norwegian: The Landing Valley) is a valley in Andrée Land at Spitsbergen, Svalbard. It is located west of Vestfjorden, the western branch of Wijdefjorden.

References

Valleys of Spitsbergen